Bryan Henning (born 16 March 1995) is a German professional footballer who plays as a midfielder for Eintracht Braunschweig.

Career
After spending one season in the Austrian Bundesliga with Wacker Innsbruck, Henning returned to Germany to join 2. Bundesliga side VfL Osnabrück for the 2019–20 season.

References

External links
 

1995 births
Living people
Footballers from Berlin
German footballers
Association football midfielders
Hertha BSC II players
FC Hansa Rostock players
FC Wacker Innsbruck (2002) players
VfL Osnabrück players
Eintracht Braunschweig players
Regionalliga players
3. Liga players
Austrian Football Bundesliga players
2. Bundesliga players
German expatriate footballers
Expatriate footballers in Austria
German expatriate sportspeople in Austria